Lucas Antônio Silva de Oliveira (born 26 August 1984), commonly known as Lucas Silva, is a Brazilian professional footballer who plays as a midfielder for Perilima. He is a Mexican naturalized citizen.

Career
Lucas signed a five-year contract with Olaria on 1 April 2002. He then signed for Estudiantes de Altamira of Mexico on 13 August 2003. He played for Estudiantes Santander in Clausura 2004 and Apertura 2004. He then played for Correcaminos in the whole Apertura 2005 and Clausura 2006 and  season. He played for Dorados de Sinaloa since Apertura 2006.

On 1 June 2008, he returned to Brazil, signing 5-year deal with Villa Rio and immediately loaned to Botafogo in 6-month deal. in January 2009 the loan was extended. In June he returned to Mexico for Atlante, but for its reserve team Atlante UTN at Liga de Ascenso. He also played twice at 2009 FIFA Club World Cup. In 2010, he left for Tiburones Rojos de Veracruz for 2010 Liga de Ascenso Bicentenario. In June 2013, after a short period of time playing for Deportivo Toluca he was signed to play for the CF Monterrey.

On December 11, 2015, Pachuca officially announced that Lucas Silva will be their new signing for the Clausura 2016 following a dreadful season for Cruz Azul who ended in 14th place in the Apertura 2015.

Honours

Club
Pachuca
 Liga MX: Clausura 2016

References

External links

 
 

Sportspeople from Bahia
1984 births
Living people
Brazilian footballers
Brazilian expatriate footballers
Brazilian emigrants to Mexico
Naturalized citizens of Mexico
Olaria Atlético Clube players
Dorados de Sinaloa footballers
C.D. Veracruz footballers
Club Puebla players
Correcaminos UAT footballers
Deportivo Toluca F.C. players
C.F. Monterrey players
Cruz Azul footballers
C.F. Pachuca players
FC Juárez footballers
Chiapas F.C. footballers
Figueirense FC players
Liga MX players
Ascenso MX players
Campeonato Brasileiro Série A players
Campeonato Brasileiro Série B players
Association football midfielders
Brazilian expatriate sportspeople in Mexico
Expatriate footballers in Mexico